David Tamkin (28 August 1906 – 21 June 1975) was an American composer of Jewish descent, born in Chernihiv, Russian Empire. He devoted much of his professional career as an arranger, composer [uncredited] and orchestrator of film scores for Hollywood movies. He worked on more than 50 films between 1939 and 1970.  His opera The Dybbuk premiered at New York City Opera in October, 1951.

References

External links
 

1906 births
1975 deaths
American male classical composers
American classical composers
American film score composers
American male film score composers
Jewish American classical composers
American opera composers
University of Oregon alumni
Musicians from Portland, Oregon
American music arrangers
People from Chernihiv
American people of Russian-Jewish descent
Emigrants from the Russian Empire to the United States
20th-century classical composers
20th-century American composers
20th-century American male musicians
Classical musicians from Oregon
20th-century American Jews